Miyaki may refer to:

Miyaki, Saga, a town in Saga Prefecture, Japan
Miyaki District, Saga, a district in Saga Prefecture, Japan
Miyaki Station, a railway station in Kamiina District, Nagano Prefecture, Japan
Kirgiz-Miyaki, a rural locality in Bashkortostan, Russia
Seiichi Miyake, Japanese inventor

See also
Tashaki Miyaki, an American rock band